Edward Vincent Dargin (April 25, 1898—April 20, 1981) was an American clergyman of the Roman Catholic Church. He served as an auxiliary bishop of the Archdiocese of New York from 1953 to 1973.

Biography
Edward Dargin was born in New York City, one of four children. He graduated from Fordham University in 1919, and completed his theological studies at St. Joseph's Seminary in Yonkers. He earned a Doctor of Canon Law degree from the Catholic University of America in Washington, D.C. He was ordained to the priesthood by Cardinal Patrick Joseph Hayes on September 23, 1922.

He served for some time as assistant chancellor of the Archdiocese of New York, and was assigned as a curate at Cold Spring in 1929. He was pastor of St. Joseph's Church in Croton Falls from 1934 to 1940. At that time, he was the youngest pastor in the Archdiocese. In 1935, he declared that the statements and activities of Father Charles Coughlin in the "arena of politics" constituted "direct violations of existing canon law."

In 1940, he was named pastor of Holy Family Church in New Rochelle. He became a papal chamberlain in 1941, and was raised to the rank of domestic prelate in 1943. From 1941 to 1943, he served as officialis of the archdiocesan court, the third-highest position in the Archdiocese. At the end of his tenure, he was reappointed to St. Joseph's in Croton Falls. He also served as pastor of St. Gregory the Great Church in Harrison and as vicar general of the Archdiocese.

On August 25, 1953, Dargin was appointed auxiliary bishop of New York and titular bishop of Amphipolis by Pope Pius XII. He received his episcopal consecration on the following October 5 from Cardinal James Francis McIntyre, with Bishops William Scully and Joseph Francis Flannelly serving as co-consecrators, in St. Patrick's Cathedral. He coordinated the fundraising campaign for Misericordia Hospital in the Bronx, raising over $2.6 million. In 1966, he was named episcopal vicar for Westchester County.

After reaching the mandatory retirement age of 75, he resigned as auxiliary bishop on August 11, 1973. He later died at the Mary Manning Walsh Home in Manhattan, aged 82. He is buried at Our Lady of Mercy Cemetery in Port Chester.

References

1898 births
1981 deaths
Clergy from New York City
Fordham University alumni
Saint Joseph's Seminary (Dunwoodie) alumni
Catholic University of America alumni
20th-century Roman Catholic bishops in the United States